Ääsmäe is a settlement in Saue Parish, Harju County in northern Estonia.

Ääsmäe Manor
The manor in Ääsmäe traces its origins to 1574, when king John III of Sweden presented the estate as a gift to his secretary Johann Berends. The present building was built in the 1770s when the manor was under the ownership of the Baltic German family von Toll, possibly by designs made by architect Johann Schultz. It is a stylish early classicist ensemble with several preserved original details.

References

External links 
Satellite map at Maplandia.com

Villages in Harju County
Manor houses in Estonia
Kreis Harrien